Ana María García (born 6 November 1957) is a Cuban volleyball player. She competed at the 1976 Summer Olympics and the 1980 Summer Olympics.

References

External links
 

1957 births
Living people
Cuban women's volleyball players
Olympic volleyball players of Cuba
Volleyball players at the 1976 Summer Olympics
Volleyball players at the 1980 Summer Olympics
Place of birth missing (living people)
Pan American Games medalists in volleyball
Pan American Games gold medalists for Cuba
Medalists at the 1979 Pan American Games